Linear focal elastosis or elastotic striae is a skin condition that presents with asymptomatic, palpable or atrophic, yellow lines of the middle and lower back, thighs, arms and breasts.

See also
 Skin lesion

References

External links 

Abnormalities of dermal fibrous and elastic tissue